Paul Maue (born 4 January 1932) is a German former cyclist. He competed in the individual and team road race events at the 1952 Summer Olympics.

References

External links
 

1932 births
Living people
German male cyclists
Olympic cyclists of Germany
Cyclists at the 1952 Summer Olympics
People from Kaiserslautern (district)
People from the Palatinate (region)
Cyclists from Rhineland-Palatinate